Leucosyrinx bolbodes is a species of sea snail, a marine gastropod mollusk in the family Pseudomelatomidae, the turrids and allies.

Description
The length of the shell attains 8.1 mm.

Distribution
This species occurs in the Atlantic Ocean off Northeast Brazil

References

External links
  Report on the scientific results of the voyage of H.M.S. Challenger during the years 1873-76 under the command of Captain George S. Nares ... and the late Captain Frank Tourle Thomson, R.N.; Zoology vol. 15 (1886) 
 
 Gastropods.com: Leucosyrinx bolbodes

bolbodes
Gastropods described in 1881